Vasil Pavlov Manchenko (5 April 1931 – 17 May 2010) was a Bulgarian basketball player. He competed in the men's tournament at the 1952 Summer Olympics, and the 1956 Summer Olympics.

References

External links
 

1931 births
2010 deaths
Bulgarian men's basketball players
Olympic basketball players of Bulgaria
Basketball players at the 1952 Summer Olympics
Basketball players at the 1956 Summer Olympics
Sportspeople from Grenoble